Kaniv Hydroelectric Power Plant is a hydroelectricity generating complex on the Dnieper River in Kaniv, Ukraine. It is operated by the Ukrhydroenego that is part of the state company Energy Company of Ukraine.

The power plant was projected by the Ukrainian department of project-research institute "UkrHydroProject" of S.Zhuk. The construction was conducted by several specialized in this field companies. During the construction also there was built a small settlement for the power plant's working personnel.

Turbines for the plant were produced by the Kharkiv Factory "Turboatom", generators - Kharkiv Factory "Elektrovazhmash".

The dam has a lock to allow water travel along the Dnieper river. It is a single-stage, a single chamber lock.

History
In 1997, the Kaniv Hydroelectric Power Plant started to be renovated. The first stage lasted until June 2002, while the second one - 2017. The first stage was financed through the IBRD, while the second World Bank invested $106 million with the addition of the Ukrainian government budget.

See also 
 Hydroelectricity in Ukraine

External links

 Information about the power plant at Ukrhydroenergy website

Dams completed in 1972
Energy infrastructure completed in 1972
Energy infrastructure completed in 1975
Hydroelectric power stations in Ukraine
Hydroelectric power stations built in the Soviet Union
Kaniv 
Run-of-the-river power stations
Dams in Ukraine
Dams on the Dnieper